Adam James Marriott (born 14 April 1991) is an English footballer who plays for National League side Bromley, where he plays as a forward.

Playing career

Early career
Beginning his career in the youth academy of Norwich City, he left the club at the age of 15 in 2006, eventually moving onto Cambridge United, making his first-team debut in 2009. During his tenure with the side, he made 56 league appearances, 35 of which were from the substitutes' bench. He spent some time on loan at Conference North side Bishop's Stortford, scoring twice in six appearances.

Cambridge City
He moved onto city rivals Cambridge City ahead of the 2013–14 season, a drop of two divisions into the Southern League Premier Division. He was prolific at this level, scoring 45 goals in 42 games as the Lilywhites finished 3rd. They were ultimately unsuccessful in their play-off campaign, and following interest from various Football League outfits, Marriott moved onto Stevenage for an undisclosed five-figure fee in July 2014.

Stevenage
After a successful pre-season campaign that saw him score five goals, including a hat-trick against Chesham United, Marriott made his Football League bow in a League Two game against Hartlepool United, which Stevenage won 1–0.

Lincoln City
In June 2016 it was announced that Marriott would join Lincoln City as their 4th summer signing when his contract expired at Stevenage. He scored on his competitive debut for Lincoln against Woking as the Imps ran out 3-1 winners. He was part of the team that won the National League for the Imps in 2016/17. He also played an important role in their famous run to the FA Cup quarter final that season, including the crucial assist against Ipswich in round 3 and an appearance against Arsenal in the quarterfinal.

Royston Town
After helping Lincoln to gain promotion to the Football League, Marriott decided to drop down to the Southern Premier & signed for Royston Town.

Marriott scored 31 goals in 43 appearances for the Crows, helping them to finish 7th in the league table only just missing out on a place in the play-offs.

Boston United
In July 2018, Boston United announced Mariott had signed for the club on a 1-year contract.

King's Lynn Town
Marriott signed for Southern League Premier Central side King's Lynn Town on 9 October 2018. Despite only joining the Norfolk club in October, Marriott went on to secure the Southern Premier Central League Golden Boot  by scoring 24 league goals for The Linnets, which helped them finish as league runners up and qualify for the end of season playoffs. Marriott's goalscoring form continued in the playoffs with two goals in the Central Premier Final victory over Alvechurch. He then netted a late equalizer from the penalty spot in the Super Play Off against Warrington Town which took the game to extra time. King's Lynn went on to win that game and secure promotion to National League North.

Despite King's Lynn being tipped to struggle in National League North, they sat top of the division at Christmas. Marriott's goalscoring form had seen him hit 21 league goals in the opening 20 games. His goal against Gateshead on 30 November 2019 was his 50th for King's Lynn Town, in just 61 games. The Linnets won the title and a second successive promotion on points per game following the curtailment of the season due to the COVID-19 pandemic. Marriott finished his Linnets career in April 2021 with 66 goals in 99 games.

Eastleigh
Marriott joined Eastleigh on 9 April 2021 on a permanent transfer until the end of the season. His first goal for the club came on 24 April 2021, with the only goal in a 1–0 victory over automatic promotion hopefuls Sutton United, helping Eastleigh's own play-off chances.

Barnet
Marriott signed for Barnet in July 2021. He scored 20 goals in the 2021-22 season, winning the Barnet F.C. Player of the Season award in May 2022. Despite this, Marriott turned down a new contract and left the club.

Bromley
On 14 June 2022, following his release from Barnet, Marriott signed for National League rivals Bromley.

Career statistics

References

External links

1991 births
Living people
People from Brandon, Suffolk
English footballers
Cambridge United F.C. players
Bishop's Stortford F.C. players
Cambridge City F.C. players
Stevenage F.C. players
Lincoln City F.C. players
Royston Town F.C. players
Boston United F.C. players
King's Lynn Town F.C. players
Eastleigh F.C. players
Barnet F.C. players
Bromley F.C. players
English Football League players
National League (English football) players
Southern Football League players
Association football forwards